Spoelstra is a surname, probably a topographic name meaning ‘from the pool’ (Frisian), from an agent noun based on Middle Low German pōl ‘(muddy) pool’, with excrescent initial -s. The suffix "-stra" is derived from old Germanic -sater, meaning sitter or dweller.  Notable people with the surname include:

 Art Spoelstra (1932–2008), American basketball player
 Erik Spoelstra (born 1970), American basketball coach and former player
 Jon Spoelstra (born 1946), American basketball executive
 Mark Spoelstra (1940–2007), American singer-songwriter and folk and blues guitarist
 Watson Spoelstra (1910–1999), American sportswriter

Germanic-language surnames
Surnames of Frisian origin
Surnames of Dutch origin